Broken Bride is a 2005 EP by the band Ludo. The EP is the second release from the band, and is a rock opera concept album.  Broken Bride was re-released  on September 29, 2009. Ludo also completed a short tour to promote its re-release by playing the EP in its entirety.  A video for "Save Our City" was released on October 6, 2009.

Track listing

Stage adaptation

University of Chicago production 
Starting in November 2006, Broken Bride was produced as a staged theater piece by University Theater at the University of Chicago.  The 28 minute concept album was adapted for the stage by first time director Paul Bruton. Bruton received permission from the band to stage Broken Bride in spring 2006 and proposed a black box theater production for that fall.  Broken Bride utilized a minimalistic, expressionist approach to stage design wherein a variety of complex locations can be implied within a limited setting. Music for the production was provided by the band in the form of a re-mixed version of the album, completely stripped of all primary and back-up vocals, with the exception of a few harmonies in "Save Our City" and "Part III: The Lamb and the Dragon".  The melodies were arranged for the fifteen member cast by Tristan Cosino, who also coached and directed the ensemble.

Chinese Mother Jewish Daughter Adaptation/Productions 
Another adaptation appeared at the 2010 Shortened Attention Span Festival with no additions to the original album. This adaptation continued on as Ludo's Broken Bride: A Rock Opera, which premiered at ANT Fest 2013 in New York City, adapted/directed by Stacey Weingarten, with new arrangements by Dana Levinson, and produced by Chinese Mother Jewish Daughter LLC. The ANT Fest production was the first time songs from other Ludo albums were added in an attempt to expand the storytelling. In 2014, an even more expanded concert version of the production consisting of 24 numbers was presented at The Cutting Room. An update of this modified version was presented at NYMF and ran for one week in August 2016. The expanded story told of Tommy (the Traveler), played by Carson Higgins, who attempts to return home to his lover, Oriel (Gabrielle McClinton), while a flashback of himself (Michael Jayne Walker) falls in love with Oriel throughout the show. Other cast members included Brian Charles Rooney as King Simius, Jamen Nanthakumar as Joe/Finn, Marissa O'Donnell as Mena/Mayor, Brendan Malafronte as Hawking, and L Morgan Hamilton as The Archangel Raguel. Reviews of the NYMF production were mixed to positive, pointing out the "grand scope and inventive stagecraft is a treat unto itself", including the "action-packed high fantasy" nature of the production and "the effect of an exploding piñata" in puppetry and projection design, despite flaws like the overabundance of plot lines, sound balance issues, and physically challenging material. In the New York Times, the production was called, "full-blown theater", "a good time, with prehistoric puppets, dream ballets, and rock undiluted for the stage".  The Ludo's Broken Bride: A Rock Opera website once stated that a production to celebrate an upcoming anniversary of album in the works, but no further information has been given... yet.

Personnel 
Band
 Andrew Volpe - Vocals, Guitar
 Tim Ferrell - Guitar, Backing Vocals
 Tim Convy - Moog, Backing Vocals
 Marshall Fanciullo - Bass Guitar, Backing Vocals
 Matt Palermo - Drums, Backing Vocals
Production
 Michael Fossenkemper - Mastering
 Joe M. Leonard Jr. - Video Editor, Video Producer
 Jason McEntire - Producer, Engineer, Mixing

References

External links 
 Ludo's Official Website
 Review of the Stage Adaptation

Concept albums
2005 EPs
Ludo (band) albums